Agnidevan is a 1995 Indian Malayalam-language family drama film directed by Venu Nagavalli and co-written by P. Balachandran and Nagavalli. It stars Mohanlal and Revathi. The plot deals with the struggle for leadership of a family-owned newspaper firm causing the family to split apart. Agnidevan was released on October 23 during the Diwali holiday period. The film features music composed by M. G. Radhakrishnan.

Plot 

The story is about the conflict between two brothers who share the legacy of "Malayalam Shabdam", a newspaper company owned by their family, the Ezhuthupura Tharavadu . Their roles as the main writers and publishers of a daily newspaper come to the forefront of their rivalry with each other. While one brother Rama Varma a.k.a. 'Appan' (Devan) has a clinical business oriented attitude to growing the newspaper industry that he heads, the younger brother Ravi Varma a.k.a. 'Aniyankuttan' (Mohanlal) feels very emotional and passionate about the craft of writing and reporting. He gives everything to enrich his relationships and cannot understand how to approach it with business goals because writing, in itself, marks tradition, legacy and so much more in their family of distinguished writers, such as their poetess grandmother, Vishwalakshmi Thampuratti (Rohini Hattangadi), their editor father, K. K. Menon (Bharat Gopy), and their writer cousin, Sudarshana (Revathi). To add more fuel to the family feud, Appan is manipulated by their company's sinister manager Anantharaman (Ratheesh) who has ulterior motives to fulfill by capturing the newspaper firm.

The innocent love between Aniyankuttan and Sudhu and Appan's interference in their relation to gain the empire and lady upon the corrupt advices of Anantharaman is accurately depicted in the film. We also get to see the escalating differences between Aniyankuttan's flamboyant and modern mother, who whiles away her time playing rummy and partying with her friends in the ladies'club and supporting her elder son's diktats, and his intellectual and down to earth father- who considers that his life is incomplete without writing. The heart-touching relationship between Aniyankuttan and his grandmother has always stayed in the hearts and minds of the Malayali audience till date.   How the younger brother wins his grandmother's and their newspaper's rich legacy by becoming a wealthy liquor baron to take back the company from the hands of Anantharaman is the rest of the film.

The film ends with the grandmother passing away due to her unbearable grief of seeing her family breaking away into pieces due to differences and fights. Anantharaman is beaten up and  banished away by Aniyan and his friends when he tries to usurp the grandmother's house. Her death and her burning pyre make Appan and his mother realize their mistakes and unites all the estranged family members once again. Aniyankuttan, after being united with Sudarshana, takes a wow before his beloved grandmother's burning pyre that he will never let the family become disunited.

Cast
 Mohanlal as Ravi "Aniyankuttan" Varma
 Rohini Hattangadi as Vishwalakshmi Thampuratti ('Muttashi')- the elderly matriarch of the Ezhuthupura family; Aniyankuttan's maternal grandmother
 Ratheesh as Anantharaman
 Revathi as  Sudarshana (Sudhu), Aniyankuttan's cousin
 Devan as  Rama "Appan" Varma, Aniyankuttan's elder brother
 Bharat Gopy as K. K. Menon, Appan's and Aniyan's father
 Jagadish as  Murukan
 Sukumari as Kochammini, Sudhu's mother
 Karamana Janardhanan Nair as Vasudeva Warrier
 Kavitha as Parvathi Varma, Muttasshi's daughter and Aniyankuttan's mother
 Maniyanpilla Raju as Poojari Potti Kunju
 Mala Aravindan as Vijayan, the mahout
 Poojappura Ravi as Payapaddan
 Mohan Jose as Jacob
 Beena Antony as Daughter of Vasudeva Warrier
 P. Balachandran as 'Edakka' Marar
 Captain Raju as Pareed
 T. P. Madhavan as Sathyan, Sudhu's uncle
 Valsala Menon as Ashram Head
 Kollam Ajith as Victor Raj, a goon
 James Stalin as Minister

Production 
The film was shot in Guruvayoor.

Soundtrack 
The film includes songs written by lyricist Gireesh Puthenchery and composed by M. G. Radhakrishnan. The songs became chartbusters especially "Nilavinte Neela Bhasmam" sung by M. G. Sreekumar. The soundtrack album was released by Millennium Audios on 15 October 1995. Puthenchery won the Kerala State Film Award for Best Lyricist for this film.

References

External links
 
 Agnidevan at the Malayalam Movie Database

1995 films
1990s Malayalam-language films
Indian drama films
Indian family films
Films shot in Thrissur
Films scored by M. G. Radhakrishnan
Films directed by Venu Nagavally